The canton of Mulhouse-3 is an administrative division of the Haut-Rhin department, northeastern France. It was created at the French canton reorganisation which came into effect in March 2015. Its seat is in Mulhouse.

It consists of the following communes:
Illzach
Mulhouse (partly)

References

Cantons of Haut-Rhin